HTF may refer to:
 Happy Tree Friends
 Hartford railway station, Cheshire, England, station code HTF
 Hatfield Aerodrome, Hertfordshire, England, IATA code HTF
 Hornell Municipal Airport, New York, U.S., FAA LID: HTF
 Housing trust fund, in the U.S.
 Swedish Union of Commercial Salaried Employees (Tjänstemannaförbundet HTF), a Swedish union

See also